Fishmongers' Hall (sometimes shortened in common parlance to Fish Hall) is a Grade II* listed building adjacent to London Bridge. It is the headquarters of the Worshipful Company of Fishmongers, one of the 110 livery companies of the City of London. The Hall is situated in Bridge Ward.

The buildings

The first recorded Fishmongers' Hall was built in 1310. A new hall, on the present site, was bequeathed to the Company in 1434. Together with 43 other livery halls, it was destroyed in the Great Fire of London in 1666 and a replacement hall designed by the architect Edward Jerman opened in 1671. This hall by Jerman was demolished to facilitate the construction of the new London Bridge in 1827. The Fishmongers' fourth hall was designed by Henry Roberts (although his assistant, later the celebrated Sir Gilbert Scott, made the drawings) and built by William Cubitt & Company, opening in 1834. After severe bomb damage during the Blitz, Fishmongers' Hall was restored by Austen Hall (of Whinney, Son & Austen Hall) and reopened in 1951.

The contents
Fishmongers' Hall contains many treasures, including the 1955 portrait of Queen Elizabeth II by Pietro Annigoni, an impressive collection of 17th- and 18th-century silver, a priceless embroidered 15th-century funeral pall, two portraits by George Romney and river scenes painted by Samuel Scott. They also hold a dagger that at one time was popularly believed to have been used by Lord Mayor Walworth to kill Wat Tyler in 1381, and was said to have been given to the City armoury by the king. However, there was no foundation to this legend, as the weapon was in the armoury long beforehand where it was used to represent the sword of St Paul.

2019 stabbing 

On 29 November 2019, Usman Khan, a prisoner attending a Cambridge University conference on prisoner rehabilitation at the hall, wearing what turned out to be a fake suicide vest, threatened to blow up the hall.  He subsequently stabbed a number of people in the hall, and two of them – Jack Merritt, a 25-year-old Cambridge University employee, and Saskia Jones, a 23-year-old volunteer – died of their injuries.  Khan was wrestled to the ground on the bridge by members of the public, before being shot dead by armed policemen; a Polish man used a pole as a weapon to fight off the attacker, while another man used a narwhal tusk which he had taken from the wall inside Fishmongers' Hall.

References

External links

 

1834 establishments in England
Buildings and structures completed in 1834
Grade II* listed buildings in the City of London
Grade II* listed livery halls
Livery halls
Buildings and structures on the River Thames